Jairo David Vélez Cedeño (born April 21, 1995) is an Ecuadorian footballer who plays for César Vallejo in Peru.

Club career
Vélez climbed through the youth ranks of River Plate Ecuador and debuted in the first team in 2013, scoring twice in the Ecuadorian Serie B. He was then scouted by Vélez Sarsfield along his teammate Danny Cabezas while playing friendly matches for River Plate Ecuador in Argentina.

The striker was first loaned and placed on the club's 5th Division youth team, scoring 10 goals which helped the youth team win the 5th Division league in 2013. Vélez was then brought up to the senior team for 2014 while still on loan. The Ecuadorian made his professional debut for Vélez Sársfield on April 27, also scoring his first goal for the club, in a 4–1 win against Rosario Central. On July 15 of 2014, Vélez Cedeño signed for 3 years with the club.

International career
In 2015, Vélez was selected to play for the Ecuador national under-20 football team in the South American Youth Championship.

References

External links
 Profile at Vélez Sarsfield's official website 
 David Vélez Cedeño – Argentine Primera statistics at Fútbol XXI  
 
 

1995 births
Living people
People from Manabí Province
Association football midfielders
Ecuadorian footballers
Ecuadorian expatriate footballers
Guayaquil City F.C. footballers
Club Atlético Vélez Sarsfield footballers
C.D. Universidad Católica del Ecuador footballers
Atlante F.C. footballers
Club Deportivo Universidad de San Martín de Porres players
Cafetaleros de Chiapas footballers
Club Deportivo Universidad César Vallejo footballers
Argentine Primera División players
Ascenso MX players
Peruvian Primera División players
Ecuadorian Serie A players
Ecuadorian Serie B players
Ecuadorian expatriate sportspeople in Mexico
Ecuadorian expatriate sportspeople in Argentina
Ecuadorian expatriate sportspeople in Peru
Expatriate footballers in Mexico
Expatriate footballers in Argentina
Expatriate footballers in Peru
2015 South American Youth Football Championship players